Harmik Singh (born 10 June 1947 in Gujranwala, Punjab) is a former captain of the Indian field hockey team and coach. He played for India in many tournaments including the 1968 and 1972 Summer Olympics. He was awarded the Arjuna Award for his achievements.

Harmik Singh is the brother of Ajit Singh, and the uncle of later Indian international Gagan Ajit Singh.

He was the head coach of the India hockey team at the 1982 and 1986 Hockey World Cup.

References 

 
 Sportal.nic.in

External links

1947 births
Living people
Indian male field hockey players
Olympic field hockey players of India
Olympic bronze medalists for India
Olympic medalists in field hockey
Medalists at the 1968 Summer Olympics
Medalists at the 1972 Summer Olympics
Field hockey players at the 1968 Summer Olympics
Field hockey players at the 1972 Summer Olympics
Asian Games medalists in field hockey
Field hockey players at the 1966 Asian Games
Field hockey players at the 1970 Asian Games
Field hockey players at the 1974 Asian Games
Recipients of the Arjuna Award
Indian Sikhs
Field hockey players from Punjab, India
Asian Games gold medalists for India
Asian Games silver medalists for India
Medalists at the 1966 Asian Games
Medalists at the 1970 Asian Games
Medalists at the 1974 Asian Games
Indian field hockey coaches